Caroline Matilda Dodson (December 17, 1845 – January 9, 1898) was an American physician.

Early life and education
Caroline Matilda Dodson was born near Keosauqua, Iowa, December 17, 1845. Her father, Stiles Richard Dodson, was the son of Richard Dodson and Hannah Watson, being a descendant of Thomas and Mary Dodson, of whom the doctor's mother was also a descendant. Her mother, Mrs. Caroline Matilda (née Harrison) Dodson, was the daughter of Stephen Harrison, and Mary Dodson. Miss Dodson's father and mother were natives of Huntingdon Valley, Pennsylvania and married in 1836. Her mother was Mrs. C. Matilda Dodson About six weeks after marriage, they left Pennsylvania for the West and settled in Van Buren County, Iowa. Stiles R. Dodson died in 1847, leaving his widow with four daughters, the youngest less than two years of age. Her sisters were named Melvina (d. 1862), Mary, and Susan. That winter, the mother taught school in her own house. In the spring of 1848, she returned with her family to her father's house in Pennsylvania. Caroline was baptized in November, 1857, and thereafter, she was a member of the Baptist church.

Study at home under private teachers and at the district school supplemented the early lessons from the mother. At about twelve, she was sent to an academy and normal institute. She began to teach in the winter of 1861. Returning at intervals to school, she followed the profession of teaching until the fall of 1871 when she matriculated at the Woman's Medical College of Pennsylvania, and entered upon the three-year course just inaugurated. Dr. Ann Preston was then Dean. The summer of 1872, she spent in the Nurses' Training School of the Woman's Hospital of Philadelphia. The course required was completed and Dodson received a certificate of the Training School for Nurses. The summer of 1873, she spent in the same hospital as student in the wards and out practice. She received her diploma in March, 1874, and went to Ypsilanti, Michigan, for further study with Dr. Ruth A. Gerry, one of the first women to practice medicine.

Career
After a year spent in hospital and private practice with Gerry, Dodson went to Rochester, New York, and there, in connection with a practice, opened a drug store. In 1877, her mother having gone West again, Dodson started for Iowa, going by the Hudson and Great Lakes. She lost a car load of valuables in the riot at Pittsburgh, Pennsylvania. 

After her trip West, she returned to Philadelphia and worked at whatever appeared to be profitable. Dodson accepted the position, and for eight years, filled it in connection with her private practice of medicine.

National Woman's Health Association of America
As a teacher, she wrote and spoke boldly for better methods of education, and advocated broadening the opportunities for study. She saw that a general movement might help to educate the masses and to spread a knowledge of self-care. To this end, after much deliberation, a call was issued for a public meeting to be held in Association Hall, Philadelphia, July 23, 1890, and an organization was effected under the name of the National Woman's Health Association of America. The association was chartered November 1, 1890. and Dodson was elected first president. The plan of the association was broad and provided for extensive work. Its objective was to bring the medical profession into closer relation with the general public by the discussion of health topics.

Personal life
Dodson read widely on subjects concerning the movements of women, speaking and writing in their interest. In 1888, at the 19th annual convention of the Pennsylvania Woman's Suffrage Association, Dodson's missionary work was noted in laudatory terms.

Dodson founded the Baptist Sisterhood in Philadelphia. She died at her home in Philadelphia, January 9, 1898, of sarcoma.

References

Attribution

External links
 

1845 births
1898 deaths
Woman's Medical College of Pennsylvania alumni
19th-century American women physicians
19th-century American physicians
People from Keosauqua, Iowa
Wikipedia articles incorporating text from A Woman of the Century